This is a list of the Swiss Hitparade number ones of 2010.

Swiss charts

Year-end charts

Singles

Romandie charts

References
Swisschart No.1 Singles and Albums 2010
Swiss Year-End Charts
Swiss Romandie Singles Chart

Number-one hits
Switzerland
2010